Katharine Hope Coward was a British pharmacologist and early adopter of chromatographic techniques.

Early life and education

Coward was born on 2 July 1885 in Blackburn, Lancashire. She studied Botany and graduated M.sc from University of Manchester. After a few years she joined University College London to study biochemistry and perform research under J. C. Drummond on Vitamin-A, paving the way for her to being nominated to the Fellow of the Chemical Society in 1923.

Career
In 1925, Coward received a Rockefeller Fellowship to continue her studies and research on vitamin A in the Department of Agricultural Chemistry at the University of Wisconsin–Madison under Dr. Harry Steenbock. On her return to Britain, she was appointed head of the Nutrition Department of the Royal Pharmaceuticals Society's pharmacological laboratories, the position which she remained until her retirement in 1950. In 1937 she was elected as an honorary member of Pharmaceuticals Society.

Chromatographic study of carotenoids
Because of her interest in nutrition and nutrients, Coward was one of the early adopters of chromatography following its introduction in the 1906-1911 by M. S. Tswett.

Carotenoids, a class of structurally-similar pigment molecules which include carotenes and xanthophylls, were of particular interest in nutritional research due to their demonstrated importance in animal studies. In his pioneering chromatographic research, Tswett showed the presence of four different xanthophylls in his studies of plant extracts, separated through the use of adsorption chromatography. Following L. S. Palmer's descriptions of Tswett's experiment in 1922, Coward replicated the methodology, the results of which she published in 1923. During these studies Coward noted the presence of additional pigment (which would later be determined to be carotenes) in the eluent fractions, nearly developing a chromatographic method for the isolation of vitamin A from the carotenoids. This experiment made her the fifth scientist to adopt the use of chromatography, during a "dormant" period before the techniques popularization in the 1930s.

This early research applying adsorption chromatography would continue in her role at the Royal Pharmaceutical Society, in conjunction with other analytical methods.

Death
Coward died at the age of 93 on 8 July 1978.

References

1885 births
1978 deaths
Alumni of the University of Manchester
Alumni of University College London
University of Wisconsin–Madison alumni
British pharmacologists
20th-century British women scientists
Analytical chemists
Chromatography
British chemists